Ducati or variation, may refer to:

Organizations
 Ducati Motor Holding, an Italian motorcycle manufacturer
 Ducati (company), an Italian conglomerate
 Ducati Corse, an Italian motorcycle racing team

Other uses
 Texas Instruments Ducati, an AV CODEC coprocessor
 Caterina Ducati, a materials scientist

See also

 Ducati Museum, Bologna, Italy

 Ducato (disambiguation)
 Ducat (disambiguation)